Eranina is a genus of longhorn beetles of the subfamily Lamiinae, containing the following species:

 Eranina argentina (Bruch, 1911)
 Eranina atatinga (Galileo & Martins, 1999)
 Eranina cendira (Bates, 1866)
 Eranina ciliata (Fisher, 1938)
 Eranina cincticornis (Bates, 1866)
 Eranina costaricensis (Galileo & Martins, 2005)
 Eranina cretaria (Galileo & Martins, 2005)
 Eranina curuca (Galileo & Martins, 1999)
 Eranina diana (Martins & Galileo, 1989)
 Eranina dispar (Bates, 1881)
 Eranina esquinas Galileo & Martins, 2008
 Eranina flaviventris (Galileo & Martins, 2005)
 Eranina florula (Bates, 1881)
 Eranina fuliginella (Bates, 1885)
 Eranina fulveola (Bates, 1881)
 Eranina hovorei Galileo & Martins, 2008
 Eranina humeralis (Martins & Galileo, 1989)
 Eranina icambi (Galileo & Martins, 1999)
 Eranina leuconoe (Bates, 1881)
 Eranina meyeri (Martins & Galileo, 1989)
 Eranina moysesi Galileo & Martins, 2008
 Eranina nigrita (Galileo & Martins, 1991)
 Eranina pallidula (Martins & Galileo, 1989)
 Eranina pectoralis (Bates, 1881)
 Eranina piriana (Martins & Galileo, 1993)
 Eranina piterpe Galileo & Martins, 2007
 Eranina porongaba (Galileo & Martins, 1998)
 Eranina pusilla (Bates, 1874)
 Eranina rondonia Galileo & Martins, 2008
 Eranina rosea (Galileo & Martins, 2004)
 Eranina septuosa (Galileo & Martins, 2004)
 Eranina suavissima (Bates, 1881)
 Eranina tauaira (Martins & Galileo, 1993)
 Eranina univittata (Bates, 1881)

References

 
Hemilophini